Salisbury Center Grange Hall is a historic Grange Hall located at Salisbury Center in Herkimer County, New York.  It was built in 1899 and occupied by the Salisbury Center Grange No. 624 since 1929.  It is a -story, gable-roofed, vernacular frame structure.  It is sheathed in clapboard siding and rests on a foundation of fieldstone and concrete.

It was listed on the National Register of Historic Places in 1999.

References

Grange buildings on the National Register of Historic Places in New York (state)
Grange organizations and buildings in New York (state)
Cultural infrastructure completed in 1899
Buildings and structures in Herkimer County, New York
1899 establishments in New York (state)
National Register of Historic Places in Herkimer County, New York